The Hundred of Bagot refers to a cadastral unit. It could be
 Hundred of Bagot (Northern Territory)
 Hundred of Bagot (South Australia)